Leel is a village in Nakodar. Nakodar is a city in the district Jalandhar of Indian state of Punjab.

About 
Leel lies on the Nakodar-Phagwara road which is almost 3 km from it.  The nearest railway station to Leel is Shankar railway station at a distance of 2 km.

Post code 
Leel's Post office is Shankar.

References 

  Official website of Punjab Govt. with Leel's details

Villages in Jalandhar district
Villages in Nakodar tehsil